Jung Dong-ha (born Jung Jae-hwan on April 17, 1980) is a South Korean singer, musical actor, radio personality and a vocal major professor at Kyungpook National University.  Jung joined as a vocalist of South Korean rock band Boohwal in 2005, after releasing three albums with Boohwal Jung left the band in 2014.

Biography

Before debut (1980–2005)

Education
Jung was born in Seoul, South Korea and graduated Kwanak High School.

Background
 In high school, he was the lead vocalist of a group called Navigator. At the university, he played vocal-guitar role in a space MHZ, and performed under the group alias Block Driver at clubs Hongik University Rollingstones, Koda, Freebird, and so on. While he was serving in the Korean Army, he formed his own rock band. After he was discharged from his military service, he worked on his music career on his own until he joined Boohwal, which is considered by many to be the living legend rock group in South Korea. He started his professional music career since then.

Motivation in musicianship
In an interview, Jung explains that a performance of "Don't Stop Me Now", by Queen, gave such an awe-inspiring impression that it motivated him to become a musician. He explains how amazed he was to experience guitar, bass, drums, and vocal cooperate to create such an amazing sound.

Audition
Completing military service in 2004, Jung entered into a recording studio of a composer he personally had friendship with and prepared his career further. From there he was recommended to bassist Seo, Jae-hyuk and was led to Bohwal's audition. At the time the band was in search of finding the new vocalist. In a radio show Boohwal's leader Kim Tae-won talked about how, in the audition, he heard Jung Dong-ha singing "고해/Gohae/Confession", which is one of well known classic Korean pop song, and was so amazed that he picked him as the new vocal at the spot.

After debut (2005–present)

Debut as the ninth vocalist of rock band Boowhal (2005)
In 2005, Jung was initiated as the ninth successor of the legacy of Boohwal vocalists. Jung's name now lists with Boohwal vocalists Kim Jong-seo, Lee Seung-chul, Kim Jae-ki, Kim Jae-hee, Park Wan-kyu, Kim Ki-yeon, Lee Sung-wook, and Jung, Dan. With his debut album Seojeong his career as a musician started.

Freshman of Boohwal (2006–08)
In 2006, Jung's second album aka Boohwal 11th Album Saarang was released. He participated in various drama OST's during years 2007, 2008

Boohwal (2009)
Starting year 2009, on February, Boohwal 25th Song Book was released. On May, Jung featured on a song titled "Aaeburrlae", and on July, he participation in an O.S.T of Korean broadcasting station MBC's Drama Chinku, Urideuluijeonseul. On August, Boohwal's new official album 25th Anniversary: Retrospect I was released. In the new album he coauthored lyrics of songs named "Thodashi Saarangii", "OZ". In the O.S.T of Drama Chiku he participated in composing the song titled "The Day". Jung joined Korean broadcasting arts performance academy as a vocal trainer in a project called "Hyun Jin-young Go Project". The academy is instituted by the Korean broadcasting station SBS. He took his first step into performing in national tours and make appearance in various media broadcasts. Following that Jung Dong-ha along with Boohwal received 2009 Mnet Asian Music Awards as the nominee of Best Rock Award, as well as the nominee of Korean Cultural Entertainment Award's Top 10 Singers awards criteria.

Marching on (2010–present)
In 2010, Jung's vocalist contract within Boohwal was renewed. In February, he was cast as the show host of a music program "Live H", and started his constant appearance in the broadcasts. The show is co-produced by Kyung-in TV and Arirang TV. In the program Jung leads the corner named "Hidden Ace", which is a special corner for the program that is scheduled once a month. In March, 25th Anniversary: Retrospect II was released and Jung participated in cheer supporting album of 2010 FIFA World Cup called The Shouts of Reds. United Korea. In April, he participated in OST of a movie called Daehanminguk 1% with a song titled "You and I". In July, he participated in OST of a game named ARGO with a song titled "Saessangwiiroe". Currently he is enrolled in Korea Art College. After the release of the album Purple Wave, single albums Geuttaegajigeumiramyeon and collaboration album Nuguhnasaaranguhlhaanda were released. The albums were compiled on the road on a nationwide South Korean tour and the collaboration album includes several former Boohwal vocalists Jung Dan, Park Wan-kyu, and Lee Sung Wook. Also single album song Ghasseumaae Keurin Suhng (Vision in Mind) and Moosa Baekdohngsuu O.S.T. called The Only Road, first musical "New Roly Poly" was released. In 2010, his vocalist contract within Boohwal was renewed. Currently he is enrolling in Korea Art College.

Following the official 10, 11, 12, 13th albums of Boohwal, Seojeong, Saarang, 25th Anniversary: Retrospect, "Purple Wave" respectively, the single albums Geuttaegajigeumiramyeon and collaboration album Nuguhnasaaranguhlhaanda was released. The albums were compiled on the road to nationwide South Korean tour and the collaboration album includes several former Boohwal vocals Jung Dan, Park Wan-kyu, and Lee Sung Wook. Also single album song Ghasseumaae Keurin Suhng (Vision In Mind) and Moosa Baekdohngsuu O.S.T. called The Only Road, first musical "New Roly Poly" was released. He is competing in a music program "Immortal Songs 2 – Singing the Legends" (bulhuui myeong-gog – jeonseol-eul nolaehada)

Rock band Boohwal
Boohwal is the name of a South Korean rock band formed in 1986. Current members of Boohwal include Kim Tae-won, Seo Jae-hyuk, Chae Jae-min and Jung Dong-ha. Jung currently plays role as the youngest member in Boohwal, presenting as much as fifteen years of age difference. The latest official album of the band 25th Anniversary: Retrospect has two parts, released in August 2009 and March 2010, respectively.

Boohwal Entertainment stated, on January 3, 2014, that Jung Dong-Ha will be parting ways with Boohwal as his contract has expired after their eight-year journey. When inquired about why Jung Dong-Ha decided to leave Boohwal even after becoming the longest running vocalist of Boohwal by You Hee-yeol in the KBS musical program You Hee-yeol's Sketchbook, Dong-Ha humbly answered that, he wanted to discover new side of himself and his singing (which he realized after becoming a contestant of KBS's other musical program "Immortal Songs: Singing the Legend"). He further added that even Boohwal needed some fresh changes to take the band to the next level. So his parting from the band came very naturally as his contract expired.

Hyun Jin-young Go Project
Jung joined the "Hyun Jin-young Go Project" as vocals trainer. An academia established by a famous Korean hip hop singer-dancer-producer in year 2009, the project has proclaimed to become full-time music production session assets benefactor to those who are nominated through the project. The project's intent was to help students of music make breakthroughs in the tough to penetrate realm of career in musicianship.

Like Book, Like Music-DJ cum RJ-Jung Dong Ha
On August 25, 2014, Jung made his debut as a radio jockey and DJ in his own radio program called "Like Book, Like Music: This is Jung Dong-Ha" (Hangul:책처럼 음악처럼, 정동하입니다 ! ; Revised Romanization: Chaekcheoreom Eumagcheoreom Jeong Dong-ha Imnida!) in Educational Broadcasting System EBS FM.

This is a radio program where Jung captivates his listeners with the power of both music and his beautiful voice. The radio program airs Monday through Saturday, 9 pm to 11 pm via online radio EBS FM 104.5 MHz and EBS Bandi. In the program, Jung listens to the concerns and views of the listeners and even invites various celebrity guests sometimes to discuss different aspects of life with them. He chooses his own selection of songs and plays for the listeners. The program has been immensely popular and successful, with search hits ranking number one within just few days of broadcast and with thousands of daily online chats and conversations about the program.

Discography

Studio albums

Extended plays

OST and special albums

Musical

Television

Radio Program

Motorsports

References

External links
  Evermore Music's Official site (Dongha's agency: Evermore Music's Official Korean site)

1980 births
Living people
People from Seoul
South Korean rock singers
21st-century South Korean male  singers